Dolena is a settlement in the Haloze Hills in the Municipality of Videm in eastern Slovenia. The area traditionally belonged to the Styria region. It is now included in the Drava Statistical Region.

Dobrava Castle was a castle in the settlement. It was first mentioned in written documents dating to 1419. The Partisans burned the castle to the ground in May 1944 and its ruins were removed after the war by an agricultural cooperative to develop the land.

References

External links
Dolena on Geopedia

Populated places in the Municipality of Videm